Raute may refer to:
Raute people
Raute language
Raute (company)

Language and nationality disambiguation pages